Severson is a surname. The following notable people have this surname:

Ben Severson, pioneer in the sport of bodyboarding and Sandy Beach local
Cam Severson (born 1978), Canadian professional ice hockey centre
Damon Severson (born 1994), Canadian ice hockey player
Dan Severson (born 1954), American politician
Edward Louis Severson (born 1964), American musician and singer-songwriter
Erik Severson (born 1974), Wisconsin politician and legislator
Herman J. Severson (1869–1950), Wisconsin politician and jurist
Jeff Severson (born 1949), former American football safety in the National Football League
Kim Severson (born 1961), writer at the New York Times
Kimberly Severson (born 1973), international equestrian
Paul Severson (1929–2007), American music arranger and composer
Rich Severson (born 1945), former Major League Baseball shortstop
Richard Severson, Brigadier General in the United States Air Force

See also
Severson Lake or Blue Earth County, Minnesota, county located in the U.S. state of Minnesota
Severs (disambiguation)
Severus (disambiguation)
Sverrisson